Justicia floribunda is a species of flowering plant in the acanthus family Acanthaceae, native to Brazil.

Each pair of leaves has one leaf smaller than the other. It requires a frost-free environment, so is often grown under glass in temperate regions. Despite its common name Brazilian fuchsia, it is not closely related to the true fuchsias.

This plant has gained the Royal Horticultural Society's Award of Garden Merit.

References

External links
Justicia rizzinii (in Portuguese)

floribunda
Flora of Brazil